Robert Davison (born 17 July 1959) is an English former professional footballer who played as a striker. He began his professional career with Huddersfield Town before spending time at Halifax Town, Derby County (twice), Leeds United, Sheffield United (twice),  Leicester City, Rotherham United and Hull City. After he retired from playing he spent time on the coaching staff of a number of clubs, including brief spells as manager of Guiseley and Ferencváros, and is currently youth team coach at Crystal Palace and assistant manager to Noel Blake's England national under-19 football team.

Playing career
Davison was born in South Shields. started his career at Seaham Colliery Welfare Red Star, before making two appearances for Huddersfield Town between 1980 and 1981. He moved on to Halifax Town on 1 August 1981 and holds a good record 29 goals in 63 appearances. This caught the eye of Derby County and between 1982 and 1987 he made 206 appearances scoring 83 goals, contributing towards their promotion to the Second Division in 1986 and the First Division a year later. He played a total of 206 league games for the Rams, scoring 83 goals and became a Derby legend.

Much to Derby fans' disappointment he was sold for £350,000 to a rebuilding Leeds United squad, managed by Billy Bremner, in November 1987.

Howard Wilkinson succeeded Bremner as Leeds managed in September 1988 and in the subsequent push for promotion Bobby became a cult hero for Leeds due to a high work rate and general rapport with the crowd. His scoring record of 35 times in 110 games is a good one for Leeds at that time. He helped them seal a return to the top flight as they sealed the Second Division title on the last day of the 1989–90 season by beating AFC Bournemouth 1–0 at Dean Court.

However, Davison lost his first team place for the 1990–91 season following the arrival of Lee Chapman, who was established as a top goalscorer. He played just five times in the 1990–91 First Division campaign and scored once as Leeds finished fourth. He managed just two league appearances in the 1991–92 campaign, which Leeds ended as champions. He was loaned back to Derby County (who suffered Second Division playoff disappointment in 1991–92) that season, scoring an impressive eight goals in just 10 league games, but the permanent return to the Baseball Ground never happened.

In 1992, he was released to Leicester City. After helping Leicester come close to achieving promotion to the Premier League, he found himself out of favour with the club, so joined Sheffield United in 1993. Again, after coming close to achieving promotion, he found himself out of favour before joining Rotherham United. After a loan spell at Hull City, Davison returned to Halifax Town, where he made 30 appearances in all competitions, scoring once.

Coaching career
In February 1998, Davison was appointed player-manager at Guiseley. He offered his resignation in October 2000 after a string of poor results left them dicing with relegation. Davison was Assistant Manager to Colin Todd at Bradford City for three years, he left the club in June 2007 when Stuart McCall brought in Wayne Jacobs. He also had short a short spell coaching Sheffield United.

On 20 February 2008, when Sheffield United announced their takeover of Ferencváros, they also announced the appointment of Davison as an advisory coach to the Hungarian side. On 16 April 2008, after the removal of János Csank, Davison became Ferencváros's new head coach. His first game in charge was a 1–0 victory against Bõcs KSC, and the team went on to win promotion the next season by 17 points.
On 30 October 2009, Ferencváros replaced the dismissed Davison with Craig Short.

In November 2010, Davison joined his former club Leeds United as youth team coach.

In December 2012, Davison was appointed head coach at Eccleshill United.

Career statistics

References

External links

1959 births
Living people
Footballers from South Shields
English footballers
English football managers
Seaham Red Star F.C. players
Huddersfield Town A.F.C. players
Halifax Town A.F.C. players
Derby County F.C. players
Leeds United F.C. players
Sheffield United F.C. players
Leicester City F.C. players
Rotherham United F.C. players
Hull City A.F.C. players
Guiseley A.F.C. players
Premier League players
English Football League players
Guiseley A.F.C. managers
Ferencvárosi TC managers
Bradford City A.F.C. non-playing staff
Sheffield United F.C. non-playing staff
English expatriate football managers
English expatriate sportspeople in Hungary
Association football forwards
Expatriate football managers in Hungary
Eccleshill United F.C. managers
Nemzeti Bajnokság I managers